Raise is the debut studio album by English alternative rock band Swervedriver. It was released on 30 September 1991 by Creation Records. The album contained six new songs; "Son of Mustang Ford", "Rave Down" and "Sandblasted" had all appeared on earlier EPs and singles released by the band between 1990 and 1991.

Early pressings of the UK LP came with a free 7", which included the instrumental tracks "Surf Twang" (a 4-track version of "Last Train to Satansville") and "Deep Twang" (a 4-track version of "Deep Seat"). The album was reissued as a remastered and expanded edition with four bonus tracks in 2008 by Sony BMG in the United Kingdom and in 2009 by Hi-Speed Soul and Second Motion Records in the United States.

In 2016, Pitchfork ranked Raise at number 15 on its list of "The 50 Best Shoegaze Albums of All Time".

Track listing

Personnel
Credits for Raise adapted from liner notes.

Swervedriver
 Adam Franklin – guitar, vocals
 Jimmy Hartridge – guitar, vocals
 Adi Vines – bass
 Graham Bonnar – drums

Production
 Swervedriver – arrangement, production
 Arnie Acosta – mastering
 Philip Ames – engineering
 Anjali Dutt – mixing
Design
 Designland – sleeve design

Charts

References

External links

 Raise at YouTube (streamed copy where licensed)

1991 debut albums
Swervedriver albums
Creation Records albums